Phylloporus scabripes is a species of bolete fungus in the family Boletaceae. Found in Belize on sandy soil under Quercus spp. and Pinus caribaea, it was described  as new to science in 2007.

References

External links

scabripes
Fungi described in 2007
Fungi of Central America